Aran may refer to:

Places

Azerbaijan 
Villages and municipalities:
 Aran, Aghjabadi
 Aran, Lerik
 Aran, Shaki
 Aran, Tovuz
 Aran, Yevlakh

Iran 
 Aran, Alborz, a village in Alborz Province
 Aran, Nain, a village in Isfahan Province
 Aran, Kermanshah, a village in Kermanshah Province
 Aran, former name of the city of Rezvanshahr, Isfahan
 Aran, former name of Bileh Savar in Ardabil Province

Russia 
 Aran, Republic of Dagestan

Elsewhere
 Aran Fawddwy, mountain in Wales, United Kingdom
Aran Benllyn, subsidiary summit
 Aran (river), in France
 Aran Islands, a group of islands across the mouth of Galway Bay, Ireland
 Arranmore, also known as Aran Island, off the coast of County Donegal, Ireland
 Val d'Aran, a comarca of Catalonia consisting of the Aran Valley
 Aran Island (disambiguation), several islands

People 
 Aran Bell, American ballet dancer
 Aran Embleton (born 1981), English female international footballer
 Aran Fox (born 1988), English ice hockey goaltender
 Aran Hakutora (born 1984), Russian sumo wrestler
 Aran Jones, chief executive of Cymuned, a Welsh pressure group
 Aran Tharp (born 1977), New York filmmaker
 Aran Zalewski (born 1991), Australian field hockey player
 François-Amilcar Aran (1817–1861), French physician

Fictional characters
 Samus Aran, the protagonist of Nintendo's Metroid video game series
 Aran Linvail, in the role-playing game Baldur's Gate II: Shadows of Amn
 Aran Ryan, in the Nintendo-produced Punch-Out!! game series

Other uses 
 Aran or Haran, brother of Abraham in the Bible
 Aran sweater, a sweater manufactured in Ireland
 , a former vessel of the Swedish Navy
 Aran (film), a 2006 film in the Tamil language
 , ISO 15294 code for the Nastaliq (Persian and Urdu) script

See also 
 
 Aaron (disambiguation)
 Arran (disambiguation)
 Arun (disambiguation)
 Earl of Arran (Ireland)
 Enda of Aran (5th-6th century), Irish saint
 Aer Arann, former regional airline in Ireland